Mills Observatory is the first purpose-built public astronomical observatory in the UK, located in Dundee, Scotland. Built in 1935, the observatory is classically styled in sandstone and has a distinctive 7 m dome, which houses a Victorian refracting telescope, a small planetarium, and display areas. The dome is one of two made from papier-mâché to survive in the UK, the other being at the Godlee Observatory.

History

Initial plans 
The history of the observatory starts with John Mills (1806–1889), a manufacturer of linen and twine in the city of Dundee, and a keen amateur astronomer. As a young man and a member of the Original Secession Kirk, he had been greatly influenced by the Reverend Thomas Dick, philosopher and author of a number of books on Astronomy and Christian Philosophy. Dr Dick attempted to harmonize science and religion, and believed that the greatness of God could best be appreciated by the study of astronomy, to which he devoted his life after a period as an ordained minister at Methven. He advocated that every city should have public parks, public libraries and a public observatory.

Mills built his own private observatory on the slopes of Dundee Law, near what is now Adelaide Place. An old print still exists showing the ruins of the building minus its dome.  There would appear to have been, in addition to the main telescope, a transit room, and what was probably a study to record and write up his observations. The fact that he had a transit instrument signifies that he must have been doing timings of the passage of stars across the meridian, and was not just a casual observer. One of John Mills' telescope is on display in the Visitor Centre attached to the Royal Observatory, Edinburgh. It is a brass instrument manufactured by George Lowden, a Dundee instrument-maker of that period, who supplied Mills with a number of his instruments.

When Dundee Town Council received the bequest they were in something of a quandary. There was no precedent for any bequest of this nature, and their first thought was to offer the money to the University College, Dundee, in the hope that they would be able to fulfil its terms. They, in turn, sought expert opinion from, among others, the Royal Greenwich Observatory, regarding the feasibility of such a project. The advice they received envisaged that only very limited public access would be possible. Evidently the College decided that the project did not fit into their plans, so they declined the offer. A Trust was then set up with the Town Council, and plans were drawn up to build the Observatory on the summit of Dundee Law. However, the outbreak of the First World War in 1914 put the whole project in pause, and the site it was intended to occupy was instead reserved for the War Memorial, which was erected after the end of hostilities. No further progress was made during the 1920s.

The onset of the Depression in the 1930s caused the matter to be raised once again, since it was felt that the project would provide much-needed work for the depressed building industry. Professor Sampson, Astronomer Royal for Scotland, was brought in as consultant. After examining several sites he came down strongly in favour of Balgay Hill as being by far the most suitable site, both in terms of astronomical suitability and for public access. This decision has stood the test of time, since other observatories have had their seeing conditions ruined by sodium lighting and other forms of modern pollution. The concept of a public observatory is, in a way, a contradiction in terms, since by definition, an observatory should be as far away from the public as possible. Most of the modern research observatories are situated on mountain-tops or desert areas. However, the geography of Dundee is unique, in that it has Balgay Hill overlooking a river estuary, protected from the main lights of the city by trees which also help to provide a purer atmosphere, and at the same time very accessible to the public. Something like 40% of all nights are observable.

Planning, construction and opening 
Professor Sampson collaborated with James MacLellan Brown, the City Architect, in designing a much more modern building than the one originally planned before the war. The structure is of sandstone blocks quarried from Leoch, near Rosemill. The Observatory was formally opened by Professor Sampson on 28 October 1935, and presented to the Town Council by Mr. Milne of the Mills Trust in the presence of Lord Provost Buist.  

A message of congratulation was sent by the Astronomer Royal at Greenwich, Sir H. Spencer Jones. Articles on current celestial objects were written in the local press by the Reverend John Lees, who usually acted as chairman at public lectures given at the Observatory by visiting astronomers The first Curator was J. Grant Bruce FRAS, an instrument-maker from Newport, Fife. This was a part-time post, with a small salary. A full-time caretaker, George Dorward, was also appointed. Hours of opening were fixed, with special arrangements for visiting parties, and for qualified persons at other times. In the winter evenings, Mondays, Wednesdays and Fridays were for the public, with Tuesdays and Thursdays reserved for private booked parties. During the day and throughout the summer, visitors could view the scenery from the balcony, using two four-inch (102 mm)  Turret telescopes by Ross, suitable for terrestrial viewing. These were excellent telescopes, also very suitable for wide-field, low-power astronomical work. Unfortunately these are no longer functioning and only parts of one remain.

In the dome, the original telescope given by the Mills Trust was an 18-inch (45 cm.) Newtonian reflector by Grubb Parsons, electrically driven.  

The dome itself, also built by Grubb, is hand-operated and made of papier-mâché on a framework of steel. The only part of the dome which has had to be replaced over the years is the shutter, where the papier-mâché perished and marine plywood was substituted. The 18-inch telescope was rarely used at full aperture, due to its tendency to be affected by reflections from street lights caused by the open lattice-work tube. 

One of the problems that restricted the astronomical work of the Observatory during this period was that Balgay Park was enclosed, and the gates were locked at dusk.  Special arrangements had to be made with the Parks Department to have a gatekeeper on duty during the nights when the telescope was in use, and for him to supervise entry and exit of public and cars, and ensure no-one was left in the park after the observatory was locked up.  This meant that all children had to be accompanied by an adult.  For this reason the Council placed the Observatory under the administrative control of the Parks Superintendent, under whom it remained until reorganisation brought a transfer to the Museums Department. The railings were removed during the War, since when the park has had "open access."  During the years 1935 to 1939 there was one staff change - Mr. Dorward retired and was succeeded by Mr. McDonald. Shortly after the outbreak of the Second World War the Observatory was closed for the duration and the staff re-deployed to work of more immediate national importance. After the war, when the Observatory re-opened, the  telescope underwent a radical transformation. 

Professor E. Finlay Freundlich of St. Andrews University, together with his colleagues R. Waland, W. Threadgill and Curator Bruce, were planning the half-scale pilot model of the 37-inch (95 cm) Schmidt Cassegrain reflecting telescope now installed in the James Gregory building at St. Andrews. This was of a much more advanced design than the standard Schmidt telescopes then in use. The Americans were also working on a similar design and the St. Andrews team were keen to be the first to have it in operation.

The problem was that they did not have a suitable mounting available in St. Andrews for the 19-inch (48 cm.) pilot model. They became interested in the Mills Observatory's Newtonian telescope as its mounting appeared ideally suited for their purpose. Permission was given by the Town Council for the Newtonian to be removed and the new instrument built in its place, on the assurance that:
"this would give Dundee a much superior instrument for direct public observation as the pilot instrument would be left permanently mounted in Dundee and available for public use."

1940s: Early years 
During the next three years the telescope room was closed to the public while the work proceeded. Only the balcony was available and observations were carried out with small instruments. The telescope was completed in 1950 and described as "the first of its kind in the world." Unfortunately, it was purely for photographic work, which rather contradicted the above assurance.
However, matters took a different course. The expansion of the city north and west and the development of sodium and mercury street-lighting hampered the work of stellar photography, so in February, 1951 Bruce and Professor Freundlich suggested that the pilot telescope be transferred to St. Andrews University Observatory, eleven miles (18 km) to the south, for better conditions and proximity to the workshops. 
Mills Observatory would then receive in exchange the 10-inch (25 cm.) Cooke refracting telescope formerly used as a student training instrument and now surplus to requirements. At first the Town Council refused, and there was much correspondence in the local press, and indignation among local amateurs, that the University should interfere with the affairs of a public institution. Professor W.H.M. Greaves, had succeeded Professor Sampson as Astronomer Royal for Scotland, was called upon to advise on the matter.  In view of the scientific benefits of the move, and lack of interest shown by University College, Dundee, he recommended that the transfer take place. This was done at the University's expense, and on the understanding that the two telescopes were on mutual loan.

The  refractor had to be modified slightly to fit the Mills dome, and the dew-cap cannot safely be used.  However, it proved to be a much superior instrument for public viewing than the old Newtonian reflector. Originally built in 1871 it was, at one time, privately owned by Walter Goodacre, president of the British Astronomical Association (BAA), who lived in the village of Four Marks, near Winchester. The telescope was used there by many famous amateurs involved in the work of the BAA and was always described by them as "the excellent 10-inch Cooke refractor".  It is particularly good for observing fine lunar and planetary detail and although not basically designed for photographic work, the lens is so good that, with modern cameras, good photographs can be taken. The Observatory has also acquired a number of smaller telescopes over the years.

1950s: Císař years 
Sometime after the Cooke telescope was installed, Curator Bruce died. In the autumn of 1952, the Observatory resumed its public functions under a new Curator, Jaroslav Císař DSc, FRAS, a research astronomer at St. Andrews.

Dr. Císař, from Czechoslovakia, soon aroused interest by his popular courses in astronomy at the adult education classes and encouraged young amateurs, including a number who became active in the Dundee Astronomical Society (DAS), which was formed a few years later.  He and A.S. Dow, Superintendent of the Parks Department, allowed the Society the use of the lecture-room of the Observatory for meetings. 

Dr. Císař, because of his St. Andrews commitments, could only devote a limited time to working at the Mills Observatory. In view of this, one of the keenest of the local amateurs, Harry Ford, a technician at Queen's College, became his assistant, and acted as Curator in Dr. Císař's absence. When eventually Dr. Cisar retired he recommended that Mr. Ford be appointed as his successor.

1967–1977: Ford years 

This was agreed to by the Council so Ford took up his duties in 1967, first of all on a part-time basis, but eventually on a full-time contract. He was accordingly the first full-time Curator of the Mills Observatory in 1972. This meant that the Observatory could, for the first time, operate on a full-time basis. The DAS became involved in work of the Observatory with the stimulation and encouragement given by Ford, who had inaugurated a programme for the instruction of the public using visual aids and experimental techniques.  He also built up interest by excellent public relations work, so that the Observatory attracted attention throughout the world of amateur astronomy. A number of exhibitions and "Open Days" were held at which the work of the local amateurs was exhibited.

Ford also organised displays of the work of the Observatory and the local Society at the BAA’s Exhibition Meetings in London, which excited great interest among the assembled amateurs, and resulted in many of them making a special journey to Dundee during their holidays. Dr. Patrick Moore, well known TV and radio personality, praised the work of the Observatory as being "quite unique in his experience." He himself has visited the Observatory on a number of occasions. The period from 1971 to 1977 was a particularly fruitful one in the history of the Observatory. This was the period of the great upsurge of interest due to the space spectaculars of the USSR and United States, culminating in the Apollo missions to the Moon. 

In July 1969, during the period of the Apollo 11 landing on the Moon, the Observatory witnessed the largest gathering of people in its history, when a colour TV was installed in the lecture-room giving full coverage of the mission, interspersed with talks, slide-shows, and an exhibition, stewarded by members of the DAS.

Another significant event which stimulated local press interest was the expedition by Ford, Morgan Findlay and Dave Taylor to observe the 1973 total solar eclipse off the coast of Mauretania, as part of the BAA organised cruise on the ship "Monte Umbe", covered for the BBC by Patrick Moore and shown on his "Sky at Night" programme on television. The photographs obtained as a result of this trip form an important part of the Observatory archives.

In 1971, a meeting of Scottish astronomical societies was held in the Observatory, and a civic reception given to the delegates from all parts of Scotland. This was to be the first of a series of important meetings hosted by the Observatory. Possibly the greatest highlight of this entire period was the "Out of London" meeting of the BAA held on 25 September 1975 at the University of Dundee, which was organised by Harry Ford and the DAS, followed by a public lecture at night given by Patrick Moore on the subject of Mars. This attracted such a wide interest that the hall was packed to overflowing and many had to be turned away.

The Lunar Section of the BAA met at the Mills Observatory on a number of occasions. At one such meeting in June 1972, Patrick Moore presented to the Observatory the original manuscript of Walter Goodacre’s observations of the Moon made with the  refractor, when it was in his ownership, saying that it was only fitting that the manuscript should be where the telescope was. Harry Ford succeeded Patrick Moore as Director of the BAA Lunar Section in 1976, with Findlay and Taylor as co-ordinators. Most of the work was carried out by local members of the Section, with the co-operation of the Museums Department. However, in November 1977, due to pressure of work, Ford resigned his directorship.

During this period also the public work of the Observatory received a great boost, with many more visitors and parties of children and adults.  Particular use of the facilities was made by school classes and youth groups. Ford extended the Observatory's displays by construction of many models including various space-crafts. He was also responsible for an important addition to the Observatory's facilities, namely the 12-seat planetarium or artificial sky, which he built himself from various oddments, and which proved a great attraction in its own right, particularly for the younger visitors, and for school parties. Although it has now been supplemented by a commercially-made planetarium which can accommodate larger parties, Ford's original planetarium is still used regularly for small groups of visitors.

Dick Kennedy, the 20-serving caretaker of the Observatory, who began after McDonald left in the 1950s and continued until his retirement in 1973. He was succeeded as caretaker by Jim Richardson, who retired the following year.

1980–90s: Flood years 

From then on the post was combined with that of Assistant to the Curator, and Thomas Flood took over that position.  In February 1982, due to domestic circumstances, Ford resigned from his post as Curator and moved south. During his period Thomas Flood served as the Curator, latterly re-designated as City Astronomer. Ford was succeeded in October of that year by the present City Astronomer, Dr. Fiona Vincent, a research astronomer from St. Andrews. Thomas Flood retired later that same year and Gary Hannan, A former member of the DAS, took over astronomer's Assistant in February 1983.

The 1982–1983 season was memorable in that the DAS Winter lectures included one by the current Director of the Royal Observatory, Edinburgh, and Astronomer Royal for Scotland, Malcolm Longair, a native of Dundee. Dr. Patrick Moore also paid another visit to the Observatory in connection with a highly successful meeting of Scottish societies affiliated to the BAA, hosted by the Dundee society - one of a continuing series of astronomical meetings held at the Observatory.
The following year saw the inauguration of great changes at the Observatory, the net result of which improved the structure and facilities in a marked way the installation of central heating, the re-surfacing of the balcony, the general redecoration of the whole building, and the upgrading of the lecture-room to an audio-visual theatre with carpeted flooring. This, together with the development of the display area and sales section, was made possible by a grant from the Scottish Tourist Board, and meant the greatest upheaval since the Observatory was built. Despite this the work of the Observatory continued uninterrupted and indeed it hosted a record number of booked parties and casual visitors, a tribute to the efforts of the Astronomer and her Assistant.

The social high point of 1984 for the Observatory occurred on June 21, with the official opening of the new improved facilities by Dr. Patrick Moore in the presence of the Lord Provost, civic dignitaries, the Curator of Museums, Adam Ritchie, members of the Museums staff and invited guests.  In his speech Dr Moore predicted that in the future, as in the past, the Mills Observatory would play a great part in the furtherance of amateur astronomy in Britain, and inspire some to take up astronomy as a career.

While attending St. Andrews University, the astronomer Robert H. McNaught was a regular visitor to the Observatory and became a friend of Harry Ford. In 1990 he discovered two minor planets, 6906 Johnmills and 6907 Harry Ford, which he named after John Mills and Harry Ford.

The booklet The Mills Observatory -A Historical Survey  by Thomas Flood was published in 1986, while Dr. Fiona Vincent was in charge. Dr. Vincent resigned in 1989 and was succeeded by her assistant, Brian Kelly. Kelly remained in post until 1999 when he resigned and the position was taken up by Jeff Lashley, who remained in charge of the observatory until November 2001.

21st century 
Dr. Bill Samson took up the post of Heritage Officer (Mills Observatory) in February 2002 and became part-time Heritage Officer at the Mills in October 2004 and retired in March 2007. Ken Kennedy was employed to work on the winter evenings when Dr Samson was not in attendance at the observatory. In 2003, the observatory was extensively refurbished with the support of the Heritage Lottery Fund.  Disabled access and other facilities were added at that time.  It was re-opened in February 2004 by HRH the Princess Royal.

A 350-metre Planet Trail, in the form of standing stones with plaques to represent the planets, was opened by Professor John Brown, Astronomer Royal for Scotland, in June 2004, which extends from the East summit of Balgay Hill (the ‘Sun’) to the Mills Observatory (‘Pluto’).  At the same time as the trail was constructed its surroundings were sympathetically landscaped and a new viewpoint established on the East summit.

In 2005, Apollo astronaut, David Scott, commander of Apollo 15 visited the observatory.

Features

Telescopes 
The main telescope is a 400mm (16inch) Dobsonian reflector that was acquired in 2013. The observatory also houses a Victorian 0.25m (10 inch) Cooke refractor, with a focal length of 3.75 m. It was made in York in 1871 by Thomas Cooke and the optical components are of the highest quality. The telescope is actually older than the building. The dome also houses a 0.3m (12 inch) Schmidt-Cassegrain telescope, which was purchased in 2006. When the Mills Observatory opened on 28 October 1935, it originally housed a 450mm (18 inch) reflecting telescope, constructed by the Newcastle based company of Grubb Parsons. The dome itself is made of papier-mâché with a steel frame, and was also supplied by Grubb Parsons. Refracting telescopes have long been regarded as the superior instrument for planetary observing. During the winter evening hours, given clear sky conditions, the telescope is used to show the public the night sky.

Planet Trail 
On Balgay Hill, an outdoor planet trail, scale model of the Solar System, is arranged to entertain and educate the exploring visitor. The planet trail is a series of standing stones and plaques representing the Solar System. The visitor starts with the Sun on the eastern summit of the Hill, and following the trail to the west from the Sun, in the direction of Mills Observatory, he or she will encounter another eight rocks representing the planets Mercury, Venus, Earth, Mars, Jupiter, Saturn, Uranus and Neptune. Pluto is represented by the pier in the Mills Observatory, which supports the telescope there.

Planetarium 
The planetarium is based around a Viewlex Apollo projector, which simulates the night sky on a domed roof in a darkened room. Around 1000 stars are displayed, along with the naked eye planets and the Milky Way. Auxiliary units simulate a rotating galaxy, and provide pictures of astronomical objects. Seating is limited to 20 for public shows.

Display Area 
The display area is split into two parts. The main area in the centre of the building at ground floor level provides changing displays of pictures and models, and also houses the observatory shop. The upper level provides displays of historic equipment and information of local importance.

Facilities
Mills Observatory is operated by Leisure & Culture Dundee. More than 10,000 people a year visit the Observatory and make use of its unique facilities. Admission is free to the observatory and displays, with a small charge for public planetarium shows.

Group Visits
Groups are admitted to visit the Observatory at any time during opening hours. Special visits incorporating a planetarium show and observing with the main telescope, weather permitting. A small charge is payable for group visits.and is a enjoyable place

Lecture Room
The lecture room can accommodate up to 40, and provision is available to project 35 mm slides, 6 cm slides, overhead transparencies, or television-based video media.

Observatory Shop
The observatory shop sells a variety of items including telescopes, souvenirs and minerals. Telescopes are also available from the observatory shop. These are the Skywatcher 114 mm and 60 mm refractor telescopes.

Image gallery
Click the image to enlarge

Sources
 City of Dundee Scotland: A Chronicle of The City's Office Bearers, Chambers, Regalia, Castles & Twin Cities, Gordon Bennett Design Limited, Dundee City Archive.
 Flood, Thomas. The Mills Observatory : A Historical Survey, Mills Observatory Documents, 1985.
 History of Mills Observatory Images, Dr. William Samson, Astronomer and Curator, Mills Observatory, March 12, 1997.
 The Overview of Mills Observatory
 Official Mills Observatory Home Page
 Presentations and Talks, Dr. William Samson, Robert Law and Stuart Clark at the Mills Observatory, Dundee.

See also
 Space observatory
 Timeline of telescopes, observatories, and observing technology
 List of astronomical observatories
 List of observatory codes
 List of largest optical telescopes in the 19th century

References

External links

 Mills Observatory Home Page
 Mills Observatory Current Events
 Leisure and Culture Dundee

Astronomical observatories in Scotland
Public observatories
Buildings and structures in Dundee
Meteorological observatories
Science museums in Scotland
Education in Dundee
Category B listed buildings in Dundee
Museums in Dundee
Science and technology in Dundee